Walking on a Thin Line is the third studio album by Guano Apes. It was released on 3 February 2003 by BMG. Title of the album comes from a line in the song "Kiss the Dawn".

The album reached #1 on the German album charts and was certified gold for shipping 100,000 copies. Lead single "You Can't Stop Me" peaked at #10 in Germany.

Background
Recording Walking on a Thin Line went slow and was delayed multiple times. In the 2005 documentary Planet of the Apes, Dennis Poschwatta said that the band "made the mistake of going [into the studio] with unfinished songs. That’s why it took a year to write and create this record." At the time of the release of "You Can't Stop Me" it was still unclear what the album title would be. Despite all that, Sandra Nasić called the album her favorite, saying she considered it "the most mature thing [Guano Apes had] done" and that they'd "essentially achieved what [she] was aiming for".

"Diokhan" is one of the oldest songs on the album: a demo version of this song was recorded as early as 1994, and was later included on the compilation album Lost (T)apes.

Track listing

Personnel
 Sandra Nasić - vocals
 Henning Rümenapp - guitars
 Stefan Ude - bass
 Dennis Poschwatta - drums, vocals

Additional musicians 
 Roland Peil – Percussion

Credits
 Artwork – Friedel 
 Engineer, mixing – Clemens Matznick
 Additional engineers – Ben Hertel, Jan Helle, Philsen Hoppen, Tom Fein
 Drumcare engineer – Rossi Rossberg
 Mastering – Ian Cooper
 Photography – Dirk Schelpmeier
 Producer – Fabio Trentini, Guano Apes
 Additional Vocal Production Producer – Artemis Gounaki, Sandra Nasic
 Programming – Dirk Riegner, G-Ball

Charts

Weekly charts

Year-end charts

Certifications

References

External links

2003 albums
Guano Apes albums
GUN Records albums